Westfield London is a large shopping centre in White City, west London, England, developed by the Westfield Group at a cost of £1.6bn,
on a brownfield site formerly the home of the 1908 Franco-British Exhibition. The site is bounded by the West Cross Route (A3220), the Westway (A40) and Wood Lane (A219).

The mall is anchored by department stores John Lewis, Marks & Spencer, and House of Fraser, as well as multi brand retailer Next and large fast fashion brand Primark. Former anchor Debenhams closed down in April 2020.

History

The development is on a large brownfield site, part of which was once the location of the 1908 Franco-British Exhibition. The initial site clearance demolished the set of halls still remaining from the exhibition (their cheap-to-build, white-painted blank facades are said to be the origin of the name White City). There were also considerable precautions needed during demolition due to the expectation of finding unexploded bombs from raids on a local munitions factory during the World War II blitz.

Elsewhere on the site was a London Underground railway depot, which had to be kept fully operational while a new depot was built underground to allow the new shopping centre to be built above both the new depot, and on the old depot site. The old depot was then demolished.

The initial plan for a shopping centre at this location was developed by a consortium, the largest company involved being the UK division of Australian property company Multiplex. However, due to heavy financial losses in other ventures, including the construction of the new Wembley Stadium, Multiplex was forced to sell its stake to the Westfield Group.

The development was built by Westfield Construction, the developer's own construction arm and was delivered on schedule. Robert Bird Group were the structural engineers for the job. The roof was designed by Knippers Helbig Advanced Engineering (Stuttgart, Germany). The project took five years to build, employing 8,000 people.

On the 7 July 2015, Mohammed Rehman and Sana Ahmed Khan planned to explode a bomb which consisted of 10 kg of urea nitrate inside the shopping centre. The attack was set to occur on the 10 year anniversary of the 7 July 2005 London bombings, but was thwarted by police.

Opening
It became the largest covered shopping centre in London having overtaken the Whitgift Centre in Croydon. Amid great hype, two million shoppers visited the centre in its first three weeks, despite the ongoing credit crunch in the UK.

However the financial crisis of the time did cause a swift fall in shoppers and some shops forcing to close in 2009. While some commentators suspected Westfield London to fail during the economic gloom, the centre reported increased sales in 2010 following an unexpectedly large number of tourist shoppers.

Extension
On 16 February 2012, Hammersmith & Fulham Council approved a 700,000 sq ft extension to the north of the existing site. Building work began in 2014, and the extension opened in three phases. The first phase opened in March 2018, and the final phase opened in October 2018.

The north side of the extension is bounded by a railway viaduct, and the south side of the extension is adjunct to the original shopping centre. The extension replaces an industrial estate which previously occupied the area, divided by Ariel Way. The extension includes  of retail space including a 70,000 sq ft Primark store, offices, new streets, public spaces, and approximately 1,522 new homes. The development ranges from four to twelve storeys high with one building of 20 storeys.

The work also includes modifications to Shepherd's Bush railway station, relocation of the White City bus station and reuse of the Dimco Buildings, and pedestrian links on the east side of the site connecting Hammersmith & Fulham with Kensington & Chelsea.

The department store John Lewis is the occupant of an 'anchor store' within the extension. Kidzania, a part of the extension, opened in 2015.

In 2015, a group of Arab terrorists tried to blow up the Westfield London but they were stopped by police. They wanted the bombing to be around the same day as that of the 2005 London attacks anniversary.

COVID-19 
On 28 April 2020 it was announced that Debenhams Westfield London store had closed permanently due to the COVID-19 lockdown and entering administration. On 28 July Hammersmith & Fulham Council's Planning Committee approved Unibail-Rodamco-Westfield's planning application on transforming two-thirds of House of Fraser's space into office spaces and two separate retail units that will face the inside of the centre. The former Debenhams space was occupied by a Harrods Outlet for a time; in 2023 it was confirmed that TK Maxx would be taking over much of the former Debenhams anchor unit space.

Constituent sections

Retail area

The centre features around 320 stores, including AllSaints, Apple, Bershka, Boots, Bose, Cotton On (includes RUBI and Factorie), Dwell, Early Learning Centre, Ernest Jones, Gerry Weber, Hackett, Hollister Co, House of Fraser, H.Samuel, Jaeger, Kurt Geiger, Lego, Mamas & Papas, Mango, Marks & Spencer, Next, Nomination, Oakley, Reiss, River Island, schuh, Starbucks Coffee, Tesla, Topshop, Uniqlo, the multiplex cinema Vue, Waitrose and Zara.

The development also includes a high-end retail area called The Village. The area includes brands Burberry, De Beers, Georg Jensen, Gucci, Louis Vuitton, Miu Miu, Mulberry, Myla, Tiffany & Co and Versace.

Vue digital cinema
Vue opened a seventeen-screen cinema on 12 February 2010, including five 3-D-enabled screens, with a seating capacity of almost 3,000.

Transport connections
As part of the planning permission for the shopping centre, Westfield Group contributed £170m towards local transport improvements, with Transport for London contributing a further £30m. These transport improvements now serve the shopping centre, as well as the surrounding area.

London Underground: Two Underground stations serve the centre - a newly built Wood Lane station (Circle and Hammersmith & City lines) on the western side, and the rebuilt Shepherd's Bush station (Central line) on the southern side. There are also two other stations close by; White City and Shepherd's Bush Market.
London Overground/Southern: Shepherd's Bush railway station is a newly constructed station on the West London Line. The station, which opened on 28 September 2008, is located on the southern side of the Westfield centre, next to the Central line tube station. The opening of the station was delayed by several months when the finished platform was found to be 18 inches narrower than the required width.
Bus and taxi: The Shepherd's Bush Interchange is located to the south of the centre next to the Overground station and includes a bus station and a taxi rank. Close to Wood Lane tube station is the White City bus station on Ariel Way. The red brick, Grade II listed Dimco Buildings, which were originally built in 1898 as an electricity generating station for the Central London Railway, was used to stable buses as the current White City bus station. The Dimco buildings were used as a filming location for the ‘Acme Factory’ in the 1988 film Who Framed Roger Rabbit
Cycle improvements: The development includes four new cycle routes, as well as 570 cycle parking spaces. However, advocates consider the new cycle routes woefully inadequate.
Road links: A grade-separated junction connects to the West Cross Route (A3220), which runs alongside the development site.

Impact and criticism
Before opening, the centre was expected to attract trade that otherwise might have gone to the already busy West End, as well as having a potentially negative impact on nearby Kensington High Street. The development has also pushed up rents in the Shepherds Bush area, which is expected to impact on the value retail offer in the area, with many businesses as well as the Shepherds Bush Market expected to suffer.  Others have criticised the centre's "clone stores".

See also
 List of shopping centres in the United Kingdom
 List of shopping centres in the United Kingdom by size
 Westfield Stratford City – a similar development in east London
 Brent Cross Shopping Centre – a similar major shopping centre in north London

References

External links

 Official website
 White City Development leaflet (Transport for London, August 2007)
 "New White City travel connections" (Transport for London, September 2008)
 White City & Shepherd's Bush description and map of transport developments
 Planned development 

London
Retail buildings in London
Shopping centres in the London Borough of Hammersmith and Fulham
Shopping malls established in 2008
Tourist attractions in the London Borough of Hammersmith and Fulham
White City, London
2008 establishments in England